HMS Savage was an S-class destroyer of the Royal Navy launched on 24 September 1942. The vessel was adopted by the town of Burton upon Trent. Savage differed from the rest of the class in being fitted with a new  gun, with a twin mounting for the QF Mk III gun forward and two single QF Mk IV guns aft. The twin mount was taken from spares for the aircraft carrier . Initially serving as part of the destroyer escort screen for capital ships, Savage joined Operation Camera off the Norwegian coast, an unsuccessful diversionary expedition to distract the enemy from the invasion of Sicily, and escorted  from Gibraltar to Scapa Flow. However, for the majority of the ship's career, Savage escorted convoys to the Soviet Union. After the war, Savage was refitted as gunnery training ship. The ship was decommissioned and, on 11 April 1962, sold to be broken up.

Design and development
The British Admiralty ordered the eight destroyers of the S class on 9 January 1941 as the 5th Emergency Flotilla. The S class were War Emergency Programme destroyers, intended for general duties, including use as anti-submarine escort, and were to be suitable for mass-production. They were based on the hull and machinery of the pre-war J-class destroyers, but with a lighter armament in order to speed production. Savage was the second ship purchased in the flotilla and differed from the rest of the class in armament.

Displacement was  standard and  full load.

The Admiralty had designs for a new  gun to be installed in twin and single turrets, the former for the upcoming Battle-class destroyers and the latter for the Z-class and C-class destroyers. Savage was equipped with a twin QF Mk III gun mounted forward and two single QF Mk IV guns mounted aft, replacing the single  QF Mark XII guns of her sisters.

To expedite completion still further, the twin mount was modified from a spare made for the aircraft carrier . Due to a shortage of Hazemeyer gun mounts, the Bofors 40 mm gun was also not deployed and anti-aircraft defence was restricted to Oerlikon 20 mm cannons. However, one additional twin and two single mounts were provided, bringing the total to twelve. Two quadruple mounts for 21-inch (533 mm) torpedoes were fitted, while the ship had an depth charge outfit of four depth charge mortars and two racks, with a total of between 70 and 130 charges carried.

The destroyer was fitted with a Type 272 surface warning radar and a high-frequency direction finding (HF/DF) aerial on the ship's lattice foremast, together with a Type 291 air warning radar on a tripod mast aft. The ships' crew consisted of 179 officers and ratings.

Construction and career
Savage was laid down by R&W Hawthorn, Leslie & Co, Hebburn, Newcastle upon Tyne, on 7 December 1941 and was launched on 24 September 1942. The destroyer was completed on 8 June 1943, and assigned the pennant number G20. Following a successful Warship Week campaign held in March 1942, she was adopted by the town of Burton upon Trent. The ship's badge was On a Field White a savage affronte holding a club Proper.

Wartime service
The diversion was not successful as it was not detected by German aircraft. On 11 August, she joined the fleet escorting them to Gibraltar in support of the Allied invasion of Italy, and on 13 October escorted  from Gibraltar to Scapa Flow.

For the majority of her wartime career, Savage supported Arctic convoys.

At the end of the war, on 12 May 1945, Savage escorted the 1st Cruiser Squadron led by  that returned Crown Prince Olav to Norway.

Battle of the North Cape

Convoy JW 55B left Loch Ewe on 20 December 1943 and was expected to reach Bear Island on Christmas Day about the same time as Convoy RA 55A which had departed Kola two days later. Savage formed part of the destroyer screen for Force 2, the covering force led by Duke of York.

Savage and the rest of heavy force intercepted the German vessel as she was heading away after unsuccessfully attacking the convoy. However, the battleship was able to make temporary repairs and attempted to escape. Duke of York fired star shells which illuminated the warship and the four destroyers in the screen, Savage, and the Norwegian , attacked with torpedoes. The battle then continued until Duke of York ceased firing and Scharnhorst sank at 19:45.

Post war service
HMS Savage was refitted and redeployed as a Gunnery Firing Ship at Portsmouth after September 1945. Reduced to Reserve status at Chatham in 1948, the ship was recommissioned for trials using new designs of shafts and propellers in 1950. Although refitted and modernised, Savage was never actively deployed. The destroyer was placed on the Disposal List in 1960 and arrived at Cashmore in Newport to be broken up on 11 April 1962.

References

Citations

Bibliography

 
 
 
 
 
  
 
 
 
 
 

 

S and T-class destroyers
Ships built on the River Tyne
1942 ships
World War II destroyers of the United Kingdom